Ivan Ivanovich Bodiul (– 27 January 2013) was a Soviet and Moldovan politician prominent in the Moldavian SSR, particularly during the Brezhnev era.

He was primarily responsible for the controversial decision to amend the Anthem of the Moldavian Soviet Socialist Republic in 1980. It was the best anthem of the Soviet Republics (according to the 1950 musical competition).

Early life 
Bodiul was born in 1918, in Oleksandrivka, Mykolaiv Oblast, in present-day Ukraine. In spite of his Moldavian origin, he was a poor speaker of the Romanian language.

After graduating in 1937 from the local agricultural college, he worked as a senior agronomist on a collective farm. From 1938-1942, he was a student of the Military Veterinary Academy of the Red Army in Moscow, where in 1940 he joined the Communist Party of the Soviet Union. After graduating from the academy, he fought in the regular army as a veterinary officer in the 127th Guards Artillery Regiment of the 59th Guards Rifle Division. After demobilization, as an ethnic Moldovan, he was sent to undertake economic work in the Moldavian SSR. He later became senior agricultural assistant to the Council of Ministers. He then moved up the ranks of the local party structure, first as leader of the Chisinau, Volontirovsky and Olanesti District Committees of the CPM and then as a student of the Higher Party School in Moscow.

First Secretary

He was the First Secretary of the Communist Party of Moldavia, the republic branch of the Communist Party of the Soviet Union from 28 May 1961 to 30 December 1980. Bodiul was one of the most authoritarian rulers of Soviet Moldavia. During first part of his rule, his policy concerns and actions were centred on nationalism, sabotage and Zionism. A number of dissidents were imprisoned, including members of the Communist Party, while others were punished. His main supporters were the 2nd Secretaries of the Communist Party (Yuri Melkov until 1973 and Nikolay Merenishchev from 1973–1981), who came from Russia, and the KGB, whose Moldavian chairmen were Ivan Savchenko (until 1966),  Piotr Chvertko (1966–1974) and Arkady Ragozin (1974–1979). Bodiul continued the fight for atheism, during which many churches were closed or destroyed. In the second part of his rule (from 1976 onwards), the anti-national policy was less harsh, and economic development expanded in the Moldavian SSR. Bodiul was known as one of the most loyal followers of Leonid Brezhnev, a predecessor in his role as Moldavian First Secretary.

In December 1976, Bodiul and his wife, Claudia, were the first high-level Soviet Moldavian visitors to Communist Romania since the Second World War and the annexation of Bessarabia and Northern Bukovina. At one of his meetings in Bucharest, Bodiul said that "the good relationship was initiated by Ceauşescu's visit to Soviet Moldavia, which led to the expansion of contacts and exchanges in all fields." In August 1976, Bodiul had met Ceauşescu and his wife at the frontier and escorted them to Chişinău.

Move to Moscow and retirement
He served as Deputy Chairman of the Council of Ministers of the USSR from 1980 to May 1985, when he retired from active politics to a dacha in the Moscow Oblast as the reformist Gorbachev era commenced. He obtained a PhD in Philosophy in 1985. He died on January 27, 2013, in Moscow. His daughters, Svetlana and Natalia Bodiul, live in Italy.

Awards
Bodiul was decorated by many Soviet orders and medals, including 4 Orders of Lenin. On 3 January 2003, Bodiul was decorated by the Moldovan President Vladimir Voronin with the Order of the Republic, "for long and prodigious work in the supreme organs of state power, substantial contribution to the development Republic of Moldova on the occasion of his 85th birthday." His decoration provoked the protest of the Writers' Union of Moldova, who renounced their own Orders of the Republic in protest.

References 
 
 *** – Enciclopedia sovietică moldovenească (Chişinău, 1970–1977)

External links
  Биография
  Кто есть кто в Правительствах СССР

 

 

1918 births
2013 deaths
People from Oleksandrivka, Mykolaiv Oblast
People from Yelisavetgradsky Uyezd
Ukrainian people of Romanian descent
First Secretaries of the Communist Party of Moldavia
Central Committee of the Communist Party of the Soviet Union members
Fifth convocation members of the Supreme Soviet of the Soviet Union
Sixth convocation members of the Supreme Soviet of the Soviet Union
Seventh convocation members of the Supreme Soviet of the Soviet Union
Eighth convocation members of the Supreme Soviet of the Soviet Union
Ninth convocation members of the Supreme Soviet of the Soviet Union
Tenth convocation members of the Supreme Soviet of the Soviet Union
Eleventh convocation members of the Supreme Soviet of the Soviet Union
Recipients of the Order of Lenin
Members of the Supreme Soviet of the Soviet Union
Recipients of the Order of the Republic (Moldova)
Burials in Troyekurovskoye Cemetery